Travis Fullerton (born November 3, 1987) is a former Canadian professional ice hockey goaltender who last played for Guildford Flames in the Elite Ice Hockey League (EIHL).

Early life and education
Fullerton was born in Riverview, New Brunswick. He graduated from the University of New Brunswick with degree in business.

Career 
Fullerton has played professionally in the American Hockey League (AHL) for the Rochester Americans, the East Coast Hockey League (ECHL) for the San Francisco Bulls, Las Vegas Wranglers, and Elmira Jackals, and in the Elite Ice Hockey League (EIHL) for the Braehead Clan, the Edinburgh Capitals, and the Dundee Stars.

References

External links

Living people
1987 births
San Francisco Bulls players
Las Vegas Wranglers players
Elmira Jackals (ECHL) players
Rochester Americans players
Braehead Clan players
Edinburgh Capitals players
Dundee Stars players
Guildford Flames players
Canadian ice hockey goaltenders
Canadian expatriate ice hockey players in England
Canadian expatriate ice hockey players in Scotland
Canadian expatriate ice hockey players in the United States
People from Riverview, New Brunswick